Panaqolus dentex is a species of catfish in the family Loricariidae. It is native to South America, where it occurs in the basins of the Napo River, the Pastaza River, and the Marañón River. The species reaches 8 cm (3.1 inches) SL.

References 

Ancistrini
Fish described in 1868